Tengku Hassan bin Tengku Omar is a Malaysian politician and currently serves as Terengganu State Executive Councillor.

Former Terengganu Director of Lands and Mines (PTG), Datuk Tengku Hassan Tengku Omar held for three terms as Ladang ADUN.

He received his highest education in economics from the University of Malaya and graduated from the University of Nottingham, United Kingdom in district administration.

Tengku Hassan also attended Sekolah Menengah (SM) Sultan Sulaiman Kuala Terengganu and SM Sultan Ismail Kemaman.

He was born on 1 January 1951 in Kerteh Kemaman and worked as a Terengganu State Financial Officer, Director of the Terengganu State Economic Planning Unit (UPEN) and Besut District Officer.

Tengku Hasan, who also has extensive experience in the field of district administration, has held positions such as Chief Assistant Land Administrator of Hulu Terengganu and Chief Assistant District Officer of Hulu Terengganu.

Not only that, he has also been appointed Chairman of A&W Malaysia, Singapore and Thailand and Chairman of Terengganu Safety Training Center (TSTC).

In the field of entrepreneurship, Tengku Hassan once held the responsibility as the Executive Director of the Entrepreneur Development Foundation (YPU).

At the state level, he was appointed EXCO for Trade, Industry, Regional Development and Administrative Welfare since 2018 while at the political level, he is a Member of the Terengganu State Pass Liaison Committee.

Election Results

Honours
  :
  Knight Commander of the Order of the Crown of Terengganu (DPMT) - Dato' (1998)

References

Living people
People from Terengganu
Malaysian people of Malay descent
Malaysian Muslims
Malaysian Islamic Party politicians
Members of the Terengganu State Legislative Assembly
Terengganu state executive councillors
21st-century Malaysian politicians
1951 births